The 2007 MLS Supplemental Draft was held on January 18, 2007, following the SuperDraft (held on January 12, 2007), as teams filled out their developmental rosters.

Changes from 2006
 2007 expansion club Toronto FC received the first pick in each round.

Round 1

Round 1 trades

Round 2

Round 2 trades

Round 3

Round 3 trades

Round 4

Round 4 trades

Unresolved 2007 Supplemental Draft Trades

References

Major League Soccer drafts
Mls Supplemental Draft, 2007
MLS Supplemental Draft